Eugeniusz Czerwiński (1887–1930) was a Polish architect.

1887 births
1930 deaths
Lviv Polytechnic alumni
Architects from Lviv